Alcoa Corporation (an acronym for Aluminum Company of America) is a Pittsburgh-based industrial corporation. It is the world's eighth-largest producer of aluminum. Alcoa conducts operations in 10 countries. Alcoa is a major producer of primary aluminum, fabricated aluminum, and alumina combined, through its active and growing participation in all major aspects of the industry: technology, mining, refining, smelting, fabricating, and recycling.

In May 2007, Alcoa Inc. made a US$27 billion hostile takeover bid for Alcan in an attempt to form the world's largest aluminum producer. The bid was withdrawn when Alcan announced a friendly takeover by Rio Tinto in July 2007.

On November 1, 2016, Alcoa Inc. split into two entities: a new one called Alcoa Corporation, which is engaged in the mining and manufacture of raw aluminum, and the renaming of Alcoa Inc. to Arconic Inc., which processes aluminum and other metals.

After relocating its corporate operations to New York City in 2006, Alcoa moved its headquarters back to Pittsburgh effective September 1, 2017. In October 2018, Alcoa announced plans to move from Pittsburgh's North Shore to a downtown Pittsburgh location.

History 
In 1886, Charles Martin Hall, a graduate of Oberlin College, discovered the process of smelting aluminum, almost simultaneously with Paul Héroult in France. He realized that by passing an electric current through a bath of cryolite and aluminum oxide, the then semi-rare metal aluminum remained as a byproduct. This discovery, now called the Hall–Héroult process, along with the Bayer process, are the dominant processes for production of aluminum from bauxite ore.

Probably fewer than ten sites in the United States and Europe produced any aluminum at the time. In 1887, Hall made an agreement to try his process at the Electric Smelting and Aluminum Company plant in Lockport, New York, but it was not used and Hall left after one year. On Thanksgiving Day 1888, with the help of Alfred E. Hunt, he started the Pittsburgh Reduction Company with an experimental smelting plant on Smallman Street in Pittsburgh, Pennsylvania. In 1891, the company went into production in New Kensington, Pennsylvania. In 1895, a third site opened at Niagara Falls. By about 1903, after a settlement with Hall's former employer, and while its patents were in force, the company was the only legal supplier of aluminum in the United States.

By 1902 New Kensington consisted of 173,000 sq. feet on 15 acres with 276 employees and the company operated hydropower and reduction plants in Niagara Falls, NY (1895), Shawinigan Falls, Quebec (1900), mining operations in Bauxite, AR (1901) and reduction facilities in East St. Louis, IL (1902). "The Aluminum Company of America" became the firm's new name on January 1, 1907. The acronym "Alcoa" was coined in 1910, given as a name to two of the locales where major corporate facilities were located (although one of these has since been changed), and in 1999 was adopted as the official corporate name.

From 1902 until 1915 additional plants in Massena, NY (1903), Alcoa, TN (1911), Edgewater, NJ (1915), Badin, NC (1915) came online while New Kensington had 31 buildings in the complex housing six departments (tubes, sheets, rods, bar and wire, extrusion, jobbing, foil) and two subsidiaries (Aluminum Cooking Utensil Company and Aluminum Seal Company). In 1907 it created the "company town" of Pine Grove, New York, for workers outside Massena. In Badin NC, Alcoa, Maryville and elsewhere the company funded the construction of schools, parks, playgrounds and medical facilities.

By the end of World War I Alcoa's New Kensington facility accounted for 3,292 workers—a fifth of the local population—and covered over 1 million square feet of manufacturing space on 75 acres.

After WWI, Alcoa obtained the rights to Alfred Wilm's duralumin patent, which led to additional research into other aluminum alloys. By 1923, Alcoa's New Kensington, Pennsylvania plant was using horizontal extrusion presses, with preheated billets, for aerospace and construction applications. One of the first industrial uses was for the Navy's Shenandoah, followed ten years later with airplane applications.

In 1938, the Justice Department charged Alcoa with illegal monopolization, and demanded that the company be dissolved. The case of United States v. Alcoa was settled six years later.

In 1963, John D. Harper, a Tennessee native who had started with the company in 1925, then was hired, in 1933, as an electrical engineer, following his graduation from the University of Tennessee, and who had subsequently served as vice president and director; was named president of Alcoa, then CEO, in 1965, then chairman, in 1970, serving until his retirement from Alcoa, in 1975. Harper was also a director of Mellon Bank N.A., Goodyear Tire and Rubber Company and Procter & Gamble, and a trustee of Carnegie-Mellon University. An advocate of close associations between business and government, in 1972, Harper, with General Electric CEO Fred J. Borch was instrumental in co-founding the Business Roundtable, and served as its chairman for three years.

In 1998, Alcoa acquired Alumax in a cash and share deal for $2.8 billion. Alcoa paid $50 a share in cash for half of the shares and 0.6975 Alcoa share for each of the remaining Alumax shares. Alcoa also assumed $1 billion in debt. Alumax's assets included the Eastalco aluminum smelter in Adamstown Maryland, the Intalco aluminum smelter in Ferndale Washington, and the Kawneer brand of building construction products.

In 2000, Alcoa acquired Reynolds Metals Co. in an all-share deal for $4.5 billion. To clear anti-competition regulatory hurdles, Alcoa was required to sell Reynolds's 25% interest in a Washington smelter and all of Reynolds's alumina refineries. Reynolds owned a 56% interest in the Worsley alumina refinery in Australia, 50% interest in a refinery in Germany and 100% interest in a Texas refinery. Alcoa also planned to sell Reynolds's construction and distribution business and the company's $400 million transportation business. Alcoa sold its packaging and consumer business, formerly called Reynolds Metals, to the Rank Group for $2.7 billion in 2008.

In 2000, Alcoa also purchased Cordant Technologies Inc. for $57 a share in cash, or $2.3 billion, and also assumed $685 million of Cordant's debt for a total transaction value of $2.9 billion. Cordant's divisions included Huck Fasteners, Jacobson Mfg. Co., Continental/Midland Group, its 85% interest in Howmet International Inc., and Thiokol Corporation. In 2001, Alcoa sold Thiokol for $2.9 billion to Alliant Techsystems (ATK).

Alcoa purchased an 8% stake of Aluminium Corporation of China (Chalco) in 2001. It tried to form a strategic alliance with China's largest aluminum producer, at its Pingguo facility; however, it was unsuccessful. Alcoa sold their stake in Chalco on September 12, 2007, for around $2 billion.

In 2004, Alcoa's specialty chemicals business was sold to two private equity firms led by Rhône Group for an enterprise value of $342 million, which included the assumption of debt and other unfunded obligations. Rhône Group then changed the name to Almatis, Inc.

In 2005 Alcoa acquired two major production facilities in Russia, at Samara and Belaya Kalitva.

In 2005, Alcoa began construction in Iceland on Alcoa Fjarðaál, a state-of-the-art aluminum smelter and the company's first greenfield smelter in more than 20 years, albeit under heavy criticism by local and international NGOs related to a controversial dam project exclusively dedicated to supplying electricity to this smelter. Also, Alcoa has completed or is undergoing primary aluminum expansion projects in Brazil, Jamaica, and Pinjarra, Western Australia.

In 2006, Alcoa relocated its top executives from Pittsburgh to New York City. Although the company's principal office was relocated to New York City, the company's operational headquarters were still located at its Corporate Center in Pittsburgh. Alcoa employed approximately 2,000 people at its Corporate Center in Pittsburgh and 60 at its principal office in New York.

Alcoa was named one of the top three most sustainable corporations in the world at the World Economic Forum in Davos, Switzerland.

On May 8, 2008, Klaus Kleinfeld was appointed CEO of Alcoa, succeeding Alain Belda. On April 23, 2010, Alcoa's board of directors selected Kleinfeld to the office of chairman, following Belda's planned retirement.

On July 16, 2012, Alcoa announced that it would take over full ownership and operation of Evermore Recycling and make it part of Alcoa's Global Packaging group. Evermore Recycling is a leader in used beverage can recycling, purchasing more recycled cans than any other group worldwide.

In June 2013, Alcoa announced it would permanently close its Fusina primary aluminum smelter in Venice, Italy, where production had been curtailed since June 2010.

On January 9, 2014, Alcoa reached a settlement with the U.S. Securities and Exchange Commission and the U.S. Department of Justice over charges of bribing Bahraini officials. Under the terms of the settlement they will pay the SEC $175 million to settle the charges. To settle the criminal claims with the DoJ, Alcoa World Alumina (AWA, a company within Alcoa World Alumina and Chemicals) is pleading guilty to one count of violating the anti-bribery provisions of the Foreign Corrupt Practices Act (FCPA). AWA will pay the DoJ $223 million in five equal installments over the next four years, bringing the company's total bill for the scandal to $384 million.

In June 2016, Alcoa Inc. announced plans to split itself into two companies.  Alcoa Inc would be renamed as Arconic and would take over the business of designing and building processed metal parts, primarily for the automotive and aerospace industries. A new company, Alcoa Corporation, would be set up and spun out of Alcoa Inc. and retain the Alcoa name. Alcoa Corp. would continue the business of mining, smelting, and refining of raw aluminum. The split was completed on November 1, 2016.

In April 2017, Alcoa announced that it would relocate its corporate headquarters back to Pittsburgh as part of a general consolidation of administrative facilities around the world.

Environmental record 
The Political Economy Research Institute ranks Alcoa 15th among corporations emitting airborne pollutants in the United States. The ranking is based on the quantity (13 million pounds in 2005) and toxicity of the emissions. In April 2003, Alcoa Inc. agreed to spend an estimated $330 million to install a new coal-fired power plant with state-of-the-art pollution controls to eliminate the vast majority of sulfur dioxide and nitrogen dioxide emissions from the power plant at Alcoa's aluminum production facility in Rockdale, Texas. The settlement was the ninth case the Bush administration pursued to bring the coal-fired power plant industry into full compliance with the Clean Air Act. Alcoa was unlawfully operating at the Rockdale facility since it overhauled the Rockdale power plant without installing necessary pollution controls and without first obtaining proper permits required by "New Source Review" program of the Clean Air Act. In February 1999, Alcoa cleaned soils and sediment contaminated with polychlorinated biphenyls (PCB) and lead at the York Oil federal Superfund site in Moira, New York, in accordance with the Environmental Protection Agency. The site, a former waste oil recycling storage facility, accepted waste oil from a number of companies, including Alcoa. The facility was improperly managed and operated and, as a result, soils on the York Oil Property and nearby wetlands sediments and groundwater were contaminated. The United States Environmental Protection Agency (EPA) issued a Superfund Unilateral Order on December 31, 1998, requiring Alcoa to excavate, treat and dispose of the contaminated wetlands sediments.

Operations by country

Jamaica 
Alcoa formed the Alcoa Minerals of Jamaica subsidiary on the island in 1959, shipping their first load of bauxite in 1963 from Rocky Point. Later in 1972, Alcoa established a 500,000 tonne per year refinery where they process bauxite into alumina. They have continued to upgrade the plant through the years and its now capable 1,425,000 tonnes per year. In 1988 the Jamaican government gained a 50% share in the subsidiary and renamed the operation to Jamalco, Alcoa being the managing partner. Expansion of the operation in 2007 resulted in Alcoa owning a total of 55% of the operation. Alcoa continues to mine bauxite in the Jamaican parishes of Clarendon and Manchester while competitors' operations take place in nearby parishes.

Ghana 
Alcoa's affiliate in Ghana, the Volta Aluminium Company, was completely closed between May 2003 and early 2006, due to problems with its electricity supply.

Guinea 
Alcoa is a major owner of the Compagnie des Bauxites de Guinée through Halco Mining, together with Rio Tinto Alcan and the Guinean government. Guinea is the second global producer of bauxite and it is said to have half of the world's reserves.

Iceland 

The Alcoa Fjarðaál smelter in eastern Iceland was completed in June 2007, and brought into full operation the following April. The plant processes 940 tons of aluminum a day, with a capacity of 346,000 metric tons a year, making it Alcoa's second largest capacity smelter. For power, the plant relies on the Kárahnjúkar Hydropower Plant, constructed and operated by the state owned Landsvirkjun specifically for the smelting operation. That project was subject to controversy due to its impact on the environment.

In 2006, Alcoa and the government of Iceland signed an agreement on instigating a thorough feasibility study for a new 250,000 tpy (Tons Per Year) smelter in Bakki by Húsavík in Northern Iceland. In October 2011, the proposed project was dropped because "the power availability and proposed pricing would not support an aluminum smelter".

Alcoa announced plans to close the office in Reykjavik.

Wales 
On November 21, 2006, Alcoa announced that it planned to close the Waunarlwydd works in Swansea, with the loss of 298 jobs. Production ceased at the Swansea plant on January 27, 2007. A small site closure team worked at the site until December 31, 2008. The site is still owned by Alcoa, but is now managed locally and renamed, Westfield Industrial Park. Several of the large buildings are leased out to local businesses.

Australia 
Alcoa operates bauxite mines, alumina refineries and aluminum smelters through Alcoa World Alumina and Chemicals, a joint venture between Alumina Limited and Alcoa. Alcoa operates two bauxite mines in Western Australia—the Huntly and Willowdale mines. Alcoa World Alumina and Chemicals owns and operates three alumina refineries in Western Australia: Kwinana, Pinjarra, and Wagerup. The Wagerup expansion plans have been put on hold due to the Global Financial Crisis. Two aluminum smelters are also operated in the state of Victoria at Portland and Point Henry; the Point Henry smelter was scheduled to be closed in August 2014. Alcoa Australia Rolled Products, a 100% Alcoa Inc. venture, operates two rolling mills. The Point Henry Rolling mill in Victoria and the Yennora rolling mill in N.S.W. have a combined rolling capacity of approx. 200,000 tonnes. Alcoa uses 12,600 GWh or 15% of Victoria's electricity annually.

Alcoa's Western Australian Wagerup plant has a troubled history in the context of claims that pollution from the plant has had an adverse impact on the health of members of the adjacent local community.

United States 
On January 3, 2003, Alcoa opened its new operations headquarters on the North Shore of Pittsburgh. This move came about after it donated its 50-year-old skyscraper headquarters in Downtown Pittsburgh to the Regional Development Authority.

Alcoa created a plant just outside Maryville in Blount County, Tennessee. To support the factory, Alcoa built a small city and named it as such. The Alcoa Tenn Federal Credit Union was the first employee created credit union in the state. The plant is no longer an Alcoa business.

Alcoa's Massena West plant is the longest operating smelter in the United States, having been in continuous operation since 1902. The Reynolds Aluminum Plant became Massena East when the companies merged in 2000.

Alcoa had a smelting plant in Badin, North Carolina from 1917 to 2007 and continued a hydroelectric power operation there until February 1, 2017 when the Yadkin Hydroelectric Project was sold to Cube Hydro.

Alcoa also operates an aluminum smelting plant of similar size to the one in Tennessee in Warrick County, Indiana, just east of Newburgh. Vectren Energy operates a coal power plant on the site to provide electricity. In 2021, Alcoa retained the aluminum smelter and generating station while selling the rest of the facility to Kaiser Aluminum. This sale included the cast house, ingot facilities, hot mill, cold mills, and finishing mills.

Alcoa maintains several Research and Development Centers in the United States.  The largest one, Alcoa Technical Center, is located East of its Pittsburgh Headquarters at Alcoa Center, Pennsylvania. The "Tech Center" is as large as some college campuses, has its own zip code and maintains an extensive intellectual and physical resource for innovation. Alcoa's extensive safety program continuously improves safety at the Tech Center. After Paul O'Neill became Alcoa CEO in 1987, Alcoa became one of the safest companies in the world, despite the aluminum industry's inherent risks.

Alcoa plans to close offices in Richmond, Virginia; Nashville, Tennessee; and Chicago.

Alcoa Steamship Company
The Alcoa Steamship company was a subsidiary of ALCOA since the company was formed in 1917.
List of ships:
SS Alcoa Banner (SS Sundance)
SS Alcoa Cavalier
SS Alcoa Clipper
SS Alcoa Corsair
SS Alcoa Guide
SS Alcoa Partner
SS Alcoa Patriot
SS Alcoa Pegasus
SS Alcoa Pennant
SS Alcoa Pilgrim
SS Alcoa Pioneer
SS Alcoa Planter
SS Alcoa Pointer
SS Alcoa Polaris
SS 
SS Alcoa Ranger
SS Alcoa Roamer
SS Alcoa Runner
SS Bushranger

In popular culture 
Alcoa is portrayed as the main sponsor of the 1953 CBS program See It Now in George Clooney's Academy Award–nominated 2005 film Good Night, and Good Luck.

See also 

 Alumina
 Aluminum can
 List of alumina refineries
 Alcoa World Alumina and Chemicals
 Alcoa, Tennessee
 Alcoa Power Generating Inc.
 Cutco, a company that sells knives, founded in 1949 by Alcoa and Case Cutlery
 List of aluminum smelters
 1953 Alcoa Aluminum advertisement
 History of aluminum

References

External links 

 
1886 establishments in Pennsylvania
Aluminum companies of the United States
Companies based in Pittsburgh
Companies listed on the New York Stock Exchange
Former components of the Dow Jones Industrial Average
Manufacturing companies established in 1886
Metals monopolies